Montuosa is a genus of flies in the family Tachinidae.

Species
 Montuosa caura Chao & Zhou, 1996

References

Tachinidae
Insects of Asia